New Tales from the Borderlands is a graphic adventure video game developed by Gearbox Studio Québec and published by 2K. A spin-off of the Borderlands series and a successor to Tales from the Borderlands (2014–2015), the game was released in October 2022 for Nintendo Switch, PlayStation 4, PlayStation 5, Windows, Xbox One, and Xbox Series X and Series S.

Gameplay
Similar to Tales from the Borderlands, it is a graphic adventure game in which the player must move the game's protagonist around the world's environment, explore their surroundings, complete quick-time events, and make narrative choices that may change the outcome of the story.  Each character has their own unique gadgets. Anu has a high-tech glasses which allow her to scan objects; Octavio can browse other people's social media pages and hack into their devices; Fran can freeze enemies using her hoverchair.

Plot
Set about a year after Borderlands 3, weapon manufacturer Tediore has begun invading the planet Promethea. New Tales from the Borderlands introduces a cast of new characters, including three playable protagonists: Anuradha Dhar (Michelle Rambharose), an altruistic scientist; Octavio Wallace-Dhar (Diego Stredel), Anu's brother who is seeking for fame and fortune; and Francine Miscowicz (Lucia Frangione), the owner of a frozen yogurt store who uses a hoverchair for mobility. The player must guide the three protagonists, each with their own hopes and dreams, as they fight against Tediore agents, as well as monsters and criminals that roam the planet. The trio must also work together as they seek a vault key which may grant them access to a vault stashed with treasures that may change their lives forever.

Development
The original Tales from the Borderlands was developed by Telltale Games, which was shut down in 2018. Gearbox Studio Quebec, which was opened in 2015, served as the game's lead developer. The team spent at least two and a half years developing the game. As the Gearbox team did not have experience developing a game featuring a branching narrative, they hired several key members of the original game's development team to help them understand how to write an interactive story which can respond to the choices and decisions made by players. The studio also hired Lin Joyce, a doctor in interactive fiction, to serve as the game's lead writer. While the game initially had a larger cast of characters, many actors were unable to complete motion capture work for the game. As a result, the writing team had to modify the game's script to focus on the three core characters, resulting in a more "intimate" story.

Gearbox considered New Tales from the Borderlands a "standalone product", and a spiritual successor to Tales from the Borderlands. It features a cast of new characters and a self-contained story, so that players will not need to have played other games in the series to fully understand the story. However, the game also features returning characters, including Rhys Strongfork, CEO of Atlas and one of the two protagonists from the original Tales, and his employee Lor from Borderlands 3. Its art also looks closer to that of Borderlands 3 than the original Tales, and the game is powered by Unreal Engine 4. New Tales from the Borderlands retains the episodic structure of the original game, but all five episodes were released at once, similar to Life Is Strange: True Colors.

Gearbox Software CEO Randy Pitchford announced a successor to Tales from the Borderlands at PAX East in April 2022. The game was officially unveiled at Gamescom in August 2022 by Gearbox and series publisher 2K. It was released on October 21, 2022 for Nintendo Switch, PlayStation 4, PlayStation 5, Windows, Xbox One, and Xbox Series X and Series S. The Deluxe Edition bundled the game with the original Tales, while players who pre-ordered the game would gain access to an in-game collectible, in-game credits, and cosmetics for the three protagonists.

Reception 

New Tales from the Borderlands received "mixed or average" reviews, according to review aggregator Metacritic. Critics gave general praise to the game's humor, but criticized the dated gameplay formula and the lack of impact of choices, and reactions to the story were mixed.

References

External links
 

2022 video games
Borderlands (series) games
Gearbox Software games
Take-Two Interactive games
Windows games
Nintendo Switch games
PlayStation 4 games
PlayStation 5 games
Xbox One games
Xbox Series X and Series S games
Video games set on fictional planets
Video games developed in Canada
Point-and-click adventure games
Single-player video games
Video games with alternate endings
Science fiction video games
Unreal Engine games
2K games